is the fifth single of the J-pop idol group Morning Musume, released on May 12, 1999 as an 8 cm CD. It sold a total of 235,010 copies, and reached number three on the Oricon Charts. In 2004, it was re-released as part of the Early Single Box and again in 2005, as a 12 cm CD. The lead vocalist of this single was Natsumi Abe. It was first single without Asuka Fukuda.

Track listing

8 cm CD 
  – 5:07
  – 4:20
  – 5:06

12 cm CD (Early Single Box and individual release) 
  – 5:09
  – 4:22
  – 5:11
  – 5:00

Members at time of single 
1st generation: Yuko Nakazawa, Aya Ishiguro, Kaori Iida, Natsumi Abe
2nd generation: Kei Yasuda, Mari Yaguchi, Sayaka Ichii

External links 
 Manatsu no Kōsen entry on the Up-Front Works official website

Morning Musume songs
Zetima Records singles
1999 singles
Song recordings produced by Tsunku
Japanese-language songs
1999 songs